Plymouth Argyle competed in the Football League Championship in the 2005–06 season, having finished 17th place in the season prior. They underwent a change in their manager, replacing Bobby Williamson with Tony Pulis in the hope of seeing an improvement to the previous season. The "Green Army" finished 14th in the league and made it to the 3rd round of the FA Cup.

Summary of the 2005–06 season 
After a poor start to the season, which made relegation a likely outcome, Argyle fired manager Bobby Williamson and brought in Tony Pulis. Argyle regrouped under Pulis and regained a solid place in the middle of the league standings. The team's performance was one of contrasts. Argyle conceded only 46 goals, which made it the fifth (tied) best defense in the league although they only scored 39 goals, which made it the third (tied) worst attack in the league. It meant a lot of 0–0, 1–0, and 0–1 games – results that are synonymous with Pulis' style of football. However, under new manager Pulis, Argyle were never in any significant danger of relegation.

Notable events
 In August, Argyle opens the season by defeating Reading 2–1 at the Madejski Stadium. It would be Reading's only home loss in the Championship all season. Victory at Reading is followed by a draw and four losses in the Championship.
 6–23 September, manager Bobby Williamson is fired. Jocky Scott is named caretaker manager. Tony Pulis is named as the new manager.
 September–October, Pulis's first shores up the Argyle defence and achieves a record of one win, one loss, and five draws in first seven games under his management.
 22 November – 18 February, young central defender Elliott Ward comes to Argyle on loan from West Ham. He stays for three months and proves successful on the field and popular with the fans. In 15 games with Ward, Argyle concede only 15 goals and achieve a record of 6 wins, 5 draws, and four losses in the Championship. Argyle move up to mid-table and while not safe from relegation, it seems very unlikely.
 18 February, striker Vincent Pericard, on loan from Portsmouth, scores a hat trick against Coventry City in a 3–1 victory. This was the biggest win of the season by low-scoring Argyle.

Squad
Squad at end of season

Left the club during season

Transfers

Out

In

Competitions

Championship

Table

Results summary

Results

FA Cup

League Cup

References 

Plymouth Argyle F.C. seasons
Plymouth Argyle